Dragoman is the seat of Dragoman Municipality in the Sofia Province, western Bulgaria. The town is located very close to the border with Serbia.  the population is 5,362.

Info

Economy
There are the following companies in the town of Dragoman:

KONTAKTNI ELEMENTI JSC   (Bulgarian: «КОНТАКТНИ ЕЛЕМЕНТИ» АД) is a company producing bimetallic electrical contact rivets and silver solders, tin-lead solders - 40, 50, 60, zinc and tin anodes. The company was founded in 1980.

Political situation
Mayor of the Dragoman Municipality is Andrey Ivanov, on the results of elections from November 8, 2011. Political party – GERB (Bulgarian: ГЕРБ, derived from Граждани за европейско развитие на България/Grazhdani za evropeysko razvitie na Balgariya, "Citizens for European Development of Bulgaria"), is a Bulgarian centre-right political party.

Honour
Dragoman Glacier on Smith Island, South Shetland Islands is named after Dragoman.

References

Towns in Bulgaria
Populated places in Sofia Province